Cytokine receptor-like factor 2 (also known as TSLP receptor, TSLP-R) is a protein that in humans is encoded by the CRLF2 gene. It forms a ternary signaling complex with TSLP and interleukin-7 receptor-α, capable of stimulating cell proliferation through activation of STAT3, STAT5 and JAK2 pathways and is implicated in the development of the hematopoietic system. Rearrangement of this gene with immunoglobulin heavy chain gene (IGH) (chromosome 14), or with P2Y purinoceptor 8 gene (P2RY8) (chromosome X or Y) is associated with B-progenitor- and Down syndrome- acute lymphoblastic leukemia (ALL).

Cytokine signals are mediated through specific receptor complexes, the components of which are mostly members of the type I cytokine receptor family. Type I cytokine receptors share conserved structural features in their extracellular domain. Receptor complexes are typically heterodimeric, consisting of alpha chains, which provide ligand specificity, and beta (or gamma) chains, which are required for the formation of high-affinity binding sites and signal transduction.[supplied by OMIM]

References

Further reading

External links